Holly Cheeseman (born December 31, 1954) is an American politician who has served in the Connecticut House of Representatives from the 37th district since 2017.

References

1954 births
Living people
Republican Party members of the Connecticut House of Representatives
21st-century American politicians